Hugh Davidson (17 May 1907 – 22 April 1960) was an Australian cricketer. He played eleven first-class matches for New South Wales between 1927/28 and 1930/31.

See also
 List of New South Wales representative cricketers

References

External links
 

1907 births
1960 deaths
Australian cricketers
New South Wales cricketers